Paleothyris was a small, agile, anapsid romeriidan reptile which lived in the Middle Pennsylvanian epoch in Nova Scotia (approximately 312 to 304 million years ago). Paleothyris had sharp teeth and large eyes, meaning that it was likely a nocturnal hunter. It was about a foot long. It probably fed on insects and other smaller animals found on the floor of its forest home. Paleothyris was an early sauropsid, yet it still had some features that were more primitive, more labyrinthodont-like than reptile-like, especially its skull, which lacked fenestrae, holes found in the skulls of most modern reptiles and mammals.

See also

 Westlothiana, from 335 million years ago, either an early amniote or a sister group to the amniotes
 Casineria, from 340 million years ago, a basal amniote.
 Hylonomus, from 312 million years ago, another early anapsid reptile
 Petrolacosaurus, from 302 million years ago, the first diapsid reptile
 Archaeothyris, from 306 million years ago, an early synapsid (proto-mammal)
 Carboniferous tetrapods

References
Arjan, Mann, et al. “Carbonodraco Lundi Gen Et Sp. Nov., the Oldest Parareptile, from Linton, Ohio, and New Insights into the Early Radiation of Reptiles.” Royal Society Open Science, 27 Nov. 2019, royalsocietypublishing.org/doi/10.1098/rsos.191191.

Carboniferous reptiles of North America
Transitional fossils
Prehistoric romeriids
Prehistoric reptile genera
Fossil taxa described in 1969
Paleozoic life of Nova Scotia